Senator Dana may refer to:

Members of the United States Senate
Judah Dana (1772–1845), U.S. Senator from Maine from 1836 to 1837
Samuel W. Dana (1760–1830), U.S. Senator from Connecticut from 1810 to 1821

United States state senate members
John W. Dana (1808–1867), Maine State Senate
Samuel Dana (clergyman) (1739–1798), New Hampshire State Senate
Samuel Dana (1767–1835), Massachusetts State Senate